Poplar Town Hall is a municipal building at the corner of Bow Road and Fairfield Road in Poplar, London. It is a Grade II listed building.

History

The building was commissioned to replace an aging mid-19th century municipal building with a distinctive octagonal tower and dome and mosaic detail on Poplar High Street which had been built in 1870, and which is also a Grade II listed building. It had become the headquarters of the Metropolitan Borough of Poplar in 1900.

The old building on the High Street had been the scene of the Poplar Rates Rebellion, led by George Lansbury, which resulted in 19 councilors being put in prison in 1921. The council sold the old town hall to a developer in 2011 and it was subsequently converted into a hotel.

In the 1930s civic leaders decided this arrangement was inadequate for their needs and that they would procure a new town hall: the site chosen for the new building had been occupied by a 19th century vestry hall. The foundation stone for the new building was laid by the former mayor, Alderman Charles Key, on 8 May 1937. It was designed by Culpin and Son in the Modernist style in a shape that took the form of a trapezoid. The design involved a rounded frontage at the junction of Bow Road and Fairfield Road; there were layers of continuous stone facing panels above and below a continuous band of glazing on the first, second and third floors. The Builders, a frieze by sculptor David Evans on the face of the building, was unveiled by Lansbury at the official opening of the building on 10 December 1938. The Portland Stone panels commemorated the trades constructing the town hall and symbolised the borough's relationship with the River Thames and the youth of Poplar. The principal rooms were the council chamber, the mayor's parlour and an assembly hall which benefited from a sprung Canadian maple dance floor.

The building was proclaimed by the council to be the first town hall to be erected in the modernist style but ceased to function as the local seat of government when the enlarged London Borough of Tower Hamlets was formed in 1965.

After being used as workspace by the council until the mid-1980s, the town hall was sold in the 1990s to a developer who added a roof extension and converted it for commercial use. It was subsequently used as a business centre.

References

Grade II listed buildings in the London Borough of Tower Hamlets
City and town halls in London
Government buildings completed in 1938
Grade II listed government buildings